Lea is a civil parish in Lancashire, England. It contains 12 buildings that are recorded in the National Heritage List for England as designated listed buildings.  Of these, one is listed at Grade I, the highest of the three grades, and all the others are at Grade II.  The parish is partly residential, but mainly rural, and the Lancaster Canal runs through it.  Four bridges crossing the canal are listed, the other listed buildings being houses, farmhouses and associated structures, and a cross that probably has a medieval origin.

Key

Buildings

References

Citations

Sources

 
 

Lists of listed buildings in Lancashire
Buildings and structures in the City of Preston